Joseph Anthony Capstick (27 July 1944 – 23 October 2003) was an English comedian, actor, musician and broadcaster.

Life and career
First son of Joe Capstick, a wireless operator in the RAF, and his wife, June, née Duncan, he was born in Rotherham, West Riding of Yorkshire, England, and spent most of his childhood in Swinton, South Yorkshire, near Mexborough, also in the West Riding, and for over thirty years he was a presenter on BBC Radio Sheffield. In the 1970s he presented Folkweave for BBC Radio 2 and continued to work for that station sporadically until the early 1990s.  Outside Sheffield, he is perhaps better known as one of the policemen in the long-running British sitcom, Last of the Summer Wine, where he played the role until his death in October 2003, with his final appearance on the show broadcast in April 2004.

Biography

A regular performer on the folk circuit, he recorded many albums. The first was for the Newcastle based record label Rubber Records (His Round with Hedgehog Pie, Punch and Judy Man, Tony Capstick Does a Turn, Songs of Ewan MacColl with Dick Gaughan and Dave Burland and There Was This Bloke with Mike Harding, Derek Brimstone and Bill Barclay). In 1981, he unexpectedly reached No. 3 in the UK Singles Chart with "The Sheffield Grinder" / "Capstick Comes Home". It was recorded with the Carlton Main Frickley Colliery Band. His recitation, "Capstick Comes Home", was based on the well-known Hovis wholemeal bread television commercials directed by Ridley Scott. "Capstick Comes Home" also peaked at number 92 in Australia in July 1981.

As a comedian, he had an eight-part television series, Capstick's Capers, on Channel 4 in 1983. Capstick was also a prolific bit-part actor, with a career including minor roles in the soap operas Emmerdale and Coronation Street. In the latter he played the recurring character of the brewer Harvey Nuttall.

His career at Radio Sheffield came to an end in January 2003. He continued to write a regular column in a local weekly newspaper, the Rotherham Advertiser.

Capstick was an author, with Paul Donoghue, of a book on the Appleby Horse Fair.

Death
On 23 October 2003, Capstick was found dead at his cottage in Hoober, near Wentworth, South Yorkshire, he had suffered an aneurysm following a bout of pneumonia. He was survived by wife Gillian and his two children from his first marriage.

Discography
His Round (with Hedgehog Pie), 1971
Punch and Judy Man (with Hedgehog Pie), 1974
Does a Turn, 1978
Songs of Ewan MacColl (with Dick Gaughan and Dave Burland), 1978
"Capstick Comes Home" / "The Sheffield Grinder, No. 3 UK Singles Chart, 1981

Filmography

References

External links
BBC Obituary
BBC list of his work

1944 births
2003 deaths
English male television actors
English folk musicians
English radio presenters
English male comedians
English chroniclers
English columnists
People from Mexborough
Actors from Doncaster
Actors from Rotherham
Actors from Yorkshire
BBC Radio 2 presenters
20th-century English comedians